Grlinci is a settlement in the Municipality of Juršinci in northeastern Slovenia. It lies on the eastern edge of the Slovene Hills in the traditional region of Styria. It is now included with the rest of the municipality in the Drava Statistical Region.

The village chapel-shrine with a belfry was built in the early 20th century.

References

External links
Grlinci on Geopedia

Populated places in the Municipality of Juršinci